Three Cuckoo Clocks (German: Die drei Kuckucksuhren) is a 1926 German silent drama film directed by Lothar Mendes and starring Lillian Hall-Davis, Nina Vanna and Nils Asther. The film's sets were designed by the art director Hans Jacoby. It premiered at the Gloria-Palast in Berlin on 25 May 1926. It was based on a novel by Georg Mühlen-Schulte. Unlike many of Mendes' films from the period, which are now considered lost, it still survives. It was released in the United States by Paramount Pictures under the alternative title of Adventure Mad.

Cast
 Lillian Hall-Davis as Gladys Clifton 
 Nina Vanna as Mary Davids
 Nils Asther as Reginald Ellis 
 Eric Barclay as Lord Ernest Clifton 
 Paul Graetz as Hotel Manager 
 Albert Steinrück as Mason 
 Hermann Vallentin as Lakington

References

Bibliography
 Bock, Hans-Michael & Bergfelder, Tim. The Concise CineGraph. Encyclopedia of German Cinema. Berghahn Books, 2009.
 Hardt, Ursula. From Caligari to California: Erich Pommer's Life in the International Film Wars. Berghahn Books, 1996.

External links

1926 films
Films of the Weimar Republic
German silent feature films
1926 drama films
German drama films
Films directed by Lothar Mendes
Films based on German novels
Films set in England
Films produced by Erich Pommer
German black-and-white films
UFA GmbH films
Silent drama films
1920s German films
1920s German-language films